Kanam is a Local Government Area in Plateau State, Nigeria. Its headquarters are in the town of Dengi.

It has an area of 2,600 km2 and a population of 165,898 at the 2006 census.

The postal code of the area is 940.

The Boghom language and Jarawa language are spoken in the LGA. Hausa language is spoken as a lingua franca of Northern Nigeria.

References

Local Government Areas in Plateau State